Artūrs Šilovs (born March 22, 2001) is a Latvian professional ice hockey goaltender for the  Vancouver Canucks of the National Hockey League (NHL). Silovs was selected by the Canucks in the sixth round, 156th overall, in the 2019 NHL Entry Draft and made his NHL debut with the team in 2023.

Playing career 
Šilovs started his hockey career with HS Riga of the Optibet Hockey League. In the 2019–2020 season he played with the Barrie Colts of the Ontario Hockey League. He was picked by the Colts 11th overall in the first round in the 2019 CHL Import Draft.

In 2021, he started playing for the Abbotsford Canucks, recording a .888 save percentage for the team in 10 games of the 2021–22 season. Šilovs made his NHL debut with the Vancouver Canucks on February 15, 2023, against the New York Rangers.

International play 
Šilovs represented Latvia in the 2019 IIHF World U18 Championships, where his team placed 8th.

He also represented Latvia at the 2022 World Championships, playing four games and recording a .952 save percentage.

Career statistics

Regular season and playoffs

International

References

External links
 

2001 births
Living people
Abbotsford Canucks players
Barrie Colts players
Ice hockey people from Riga
Latvian ice hockey goaltenders
Manitoba Moose players
Trois-Rivières Lions players
Vancouver Canucks draft picks
Vancouver Canucks players